Snapshot of a Crime is a 1975 Italian giallo film written and directed by Mario Imperoli (here credited as Arthur Saxon).

Plot 
Two women, apparently linked by a deep friendship, are involved in an obscure series of blackmails by a stranger.

Cast 

Erna Schürer as Mirna
Monica Strebel as  Claudia 
Luis La Torre as  Luca  
Lorenza Guerrieri as Stefania

References

External links

Snapshot of a Crime at Variety Distribution

1970s Italian-language films
Giallo films
1970s crime thriller films
Films directed by Mario Imperoli
1970s Italian films
Italian crime thriller films